Sandra Stark (born 1951) is an American photographer.

Her work is included in the collections of the Museum of Fine Arts Houston, the Boston Museum of Fine Arts and the Fogg Museum at Harvard University.

References

Living people
1951 births
20th-century American photographers
21st-century American photographers
20th-century American women artists
21st-century American women artists